Paul Wesley Airey (December 13, 1923 – March 11, 2009) was an airman of the United States Air Force who served as the first Chief Master Sergeant of the Air Force from 1967 to 1969.

Early life and education
Airey born on December 13, 1923, in New Bedford, Massachusetts. He entered military service in 1940 after two years of high school in Quincy, Massachusetts. In 1948 he obtained his high school equivalency certificate, and later completed 62 semester hours of study at McKendree College, Lebanon, Illinois. His military schooling included courses in communication mechanics and personnel management. He is a graduate of the Air Defense Command Noncommissioned Officer Academy. The academy was renamed the Paul W. Airey NCO Academy on December 13, 2006, in his honor.

Military career
Airey enlisted in the United States Army Air Forces in November 1942. During World War II, he was an aerial gunner and radio operator on B-24 Liberator bombers and is credited with 28 combat missions over Europe. In July 1944, on his 28th combat mission, a bombing run over Vienna, Austria, Airey was forced to bail out of his flak-damaged aircraft over Hungary. He was captured by the German military and was taken to Stalag Luft IV, a prisoner of war (POW) camp near the Baltic Sea for Allied airmen. In February 1945, Airey and 6,000 fellow POWs were forced to march 400 miles to another camp near Berlin as the Soviet Red Army got closer. He was liberated in May 1945 by British forces. By that time, Airey had dysentery and weighed less than 100 pounds.

Airey reenlisted in the Air Force after completing a recuperation leave. He went to Naha Air Base, Okinawa, where he was responsible for radio repair. During the Korean War he was awarded the Legion of Merit, unusual for an enlisted person, for saving more than a million dollars in electronic equipment that would have deteriorated without the corrosion control assembly line he developed.

Airey spent 14 of his 30-year career as a first sergeant. This included assignment to the Air Defense Command's 4756th Civil Engineering Squadron at Tyndall Air Force Base, Florida. On April 3, 1967, he was appointed the first Chief Master Sergeant of the Air Force, the service's ultimate noncommissioned officer position, having been selected from among 21 major command nominees. In this role he was adviser to Secretary of the Air Force Richard Campbell and Air Force Chief of Staff, General John P. McConnell.

Later life
Airey retired from the Air Force on August 1, 1970. He died in Panama City, Florida, on March 11, 2009.

Awards and decorations

Professional memberships and associations

References

1923 births
2009 deaths
United States Army Air Forces soldiers
Chief Master Sergeants of the United States Air Force
Recipients of the Air Medal
American prisoners of war in World War II
Recipients of the Legion of Merit
Burials at Arlington National Cemetery
United States Army Air Forces personnel of World War II
United States Air Force personnel of the Korean War
World War II prisoners of war held by Germany
Shot-down aviators